Catherine Abbo (born 1972) is a Ugandan researcher, medical doctor and academic. She is currently serving as a  Lecturer in the Department of Psychiatry, School of Medicine, College of Health Sciences at Makerere University.

Education
She graduated from  Makerere University with a Bachelor of Medicine and surgery , a Masters degree in Psychiatry from Makerere University, a joint PhD in Transcultural Psychiatry from Makerere University and Karolinska Institute, in Sweden (2005-2009).  Her  Master of Philosophy in Child and Adolescent Psychiatry from University of Cape (2012-2014).  She is a fellow of College of Medicine of South Africa.

Career
Abbo did her medical internship at Mulago hospital in Kampala after  she served  as  a  Medical Officer in Butabika National Mental Referral Hospital. In June 2006, Abbo joined Makerere University as an Assistant lecturer in the Department of Psychiatry. She is a visiting lecturer at Gulu University in faculty of Medicine.

Research
She has published the finding of her research in Child and Adolescent, Psychiatry and Mental Health and Transcultural Psychiatry in medical journals and other peer publications hence cited with an H-index of 46 with  847 citations and has thus  published research findings in over 67 peer-reviewed journal Scientific publications. She was awarded the Young Minds Award 2005  in Psychiatry by  American Psychiatric Association in International Category 

She serves as the President  Elect Uganda Psychiatric Association,  Chairperson for UMA SACCO, Chairperson for Governing Council at Butabika School of Psychiatric Clinical Officers.

References

External links
Catherine Abbo | Makerere University College Of Health Sciences | MakCHS
Loop | Catherine Abbo
Catherine Abbo | Makerere University - Academia.edu
Catherine Abbo Profile - The International Alumni Association

Living people
1972 births
Academic staff of Makerere University
Makerere University alumni
People from Eastern Region, Uganda
Karolinska Institute alumni